The 1931 Penn Quakers football team was an American football team that represented the University of Pennsylvania as an independent during the 1931 college football season. In their first season under head coach Harvey Harman, the Quakers compiled a 6–3 record and outscored opponents by a total of 121 to 94. The team played its home games at Franklin Field in Philadelphia.

Schedule

References

Penn
Penn Quakers football seasons
Penn Quakers football